Falcău may refer to the following places:

 Falcău, a tributary of the Suceava in Suceava County, Romania
 Falcău, a tributary of the Calul in Neamț County, Romania
 Falcău, a village in the commune Brodina, Suceava County, Romania
 Falcău, the Romanian name for the village Falkiv in the commune Dolishniy Shepit, Chernivtsi Oblast, Ukraine